Lalkeh Poshteh (also known as Lalkeh Posht) is a village in Tula Rud Rural District, in the Central District of Talesh County, Gilan Province, Iran. At the 2006 census, its population was 161, in 37 families.

References 

Populated places in Talesh County